José Luis Rubio Camargo (born 17 October 1996) is a Mexican beach volleyball player. He competed in the 2020 Summer Olympics.

References

External links
 
 
 
 

1996 births
Living people
Beach volleyball players at the 2020 Summer Olympics
Mexican beach volleyball players
Olympic beach volleyball players of Mexico